Jim Cooper (born 1954) is the Member of the U.S. House of Representatives from Tennessee's 5th district.

Jim Cooper may also refer to:

Jim Cooper (footballer) (born 1942), English footballer
Jim Cooper (potter) (born 1955), New Zealand potter
Jim Cooper (American football) (born 1955), American football offensive lineman in the NFL
Jim Cooper (California politician) (born 1964), member of the California State Assembly
Jim Cooper (musician), American Christian musician, songwriter, and producer

See also
Jimmy Cooper (disambiguation)
James Cooper (disambiguation)